Jeff Serr (born August 20, 1955) is an American voice actor and former radio personality, best known for radio programs heard in Los Angeles, and San Francisco, on popular stations including KYA, KIOI, and KIIS-FM. In recent years, Serr has lent his voice to TV and radio ad campaigns for National Car Rental, Diet Pepsi, and Nissan, among many others. Serr was born in Santa Barbara, California.

According to the disc jockey directory website 440:Satisfaction, Serr began his radio career at KBLF in Red Bluff, Calif. From there, he moved to KSJO in San Jose. Subsequent stops included KIOI and KYA, in San Francisco, and KIIS-FM (1982) and KCBS-FM (1988),
in Los Angeles.

Serr is descended from Mayflower (1620) passenger Edward Fuller, and through this line is the 11th generation of his family born in North America.

References

External links
Jeff Serr's official website

American radio personalities
People from Santa Barbara, California
1965 births
Living people